II=I (Two is One) is the second album by the progressive metal band Andromeda, released in 2003.

The album received reviews of 1.5/5 from Allmusic, 7/10 from Metal.de, 8.5/10 from DPRP, and Powermetal.de.

Track listing
 "Encyclopedia"  – 7:08
 "Mirages"  – 5:42
 "Reaching Deep Within"  – 4:50
 "Two Is One"  – 9:05
 "Morphing Into Nothing"  – 7:35
 "Castaway"  – 6:17
 "Parasite"  – 6:55
 "One In My Head"  – 8:03
 "This Fragile Surface"  – 8:05

Credits

Band
Johan Reinholdz – guitar, bass
David Fremberg – vocals
Martin Hedin – keyboards
Thomas Lejon – drums

Other
Martin Hedin - Engineer
Göran Finnberg - Mastering
Mattias Norén - Artwork and layout
Andromeda - Executive producer
Freddy Billqvist - Photos

References

External links
Metalist.il review (in Hebrew)

2003 albums
Andromeda (Swedish band) albums
Century Media Records albums